Barry Gillis (born 12 January 1980) is a Gaelic footballer who plays for the Derry county team, with whom he has won the National League twice. He plays his club football for Magherafelt O'Donovan Rossa.

Gillis plays full forward for Magherafelt, but plays as goalkeeper for Derry. He is in the unique position of winning a National League medal as an outfielder (2000), and another National League medal as goalkeeper (2008).

Playing career

Inter-county
Gillis was originally called up to the Derry panel as an outfielder in the late 1990s and was on the panel for Derry's 2000 National League success. Gillis was part of the panel when Derry reached that year's Ulster Senior Football Championship final, but were defeated by Armagh. He pulled out of the panel for a couple of seasons in the 2000s as he was working in Dublin, but returned again.

He was part of the Derry team that won the 2008 National League where Derry beat Kerry in the final.

Honours

County
National Football League:
Winner (2): 2000, 2008
Ulster Senior Football Championship:
Runner up: 2000
Dr McKenna Cup:
Runner up: 2005, 2008, more?

Note: The above lists may be incomplete. Please add any other honours you know of.

References

External links
Hogan Stand article on Gillis (January 2009)
Player profiles on Official Derry GAA website

1980 births
Living people
Derry inter-county Gaelic footballers
Gaelic football goalkeepers
Magherafelt Gaelic footballers
People from Magherafelt